Gregory Joseph Boyle, S.J. (born May 19, 1954) is an American Roman Catholic priest of the Jesuit order. He is the founder and director of Homeboy Industries, the world's largest gang-intervention and rehabilitation program, and former pastor of Dolores Mission Church in Los Angeles.

Early life and education
Boyle was born in Los Angeles, and is one of eight siblings born to Kathleen and Bernie Boyle (both now deceased). He attended Loyola High School and, upon graduating in 1972, entered the Society of Jesus (the Jesuits). Boyle was ordained a priest in 1984.

He holds a bachelor's degree in philosophy and English from Gonzaga University in Spokane, Washington, a master's degree in English from Loyola Marymount University in Los Angeles, a Master of Divinity (M.Div.) degree from the Weston School of Theology, Cambridge, Massachusetts, and a Master of Sacred Theology degree from the Jesuit School of Theology, Berkeley, California.

Early career
At the conclusion of his theology studies, Boyle spent a year living and working with Christian base communities in Cochabamba, Bolivia. Upon his return in 1986, he was appointed pastor of Dolores Mission Church, a Jesuit parish in the Boyle Heights neighborhood of East Los Angeles that was then the poorest Catholic church in the city. At the time, the church sat between two large public housing projects and amid the territories of numerous gangs.

Homeboy Industries
By 1988, in an effort to address the escalating problems and unmet needs of gang-involved youth, Boyle, parish and, community members began to develop positive opportunities for them, including establishing an alternative school and a day care program, and seeking out legitimate employment, calling this initial effort Jobs for a Future.

In the wake of the 1992 Los Angeles riots, Jobs for a Future and Proyecto Pastoral, a community organizing project begun at the parish, launched their first social enterprise business, Homeboy Bakery. In the ensuing years, the success of the bakery created the groundwork for additional social enterprise businesses, leading Jobs for a Future to become an independent nonprofit organization, Homeboy Industries.

Homeboy Industries is the largest and most successful gang rehabilitation and re-entry program in the world. Homeboy offers an 
"exit ramp" for those stuck in a cycle of violence and incarceration. The organization's holistic approach, with free services and programs, supports around 10,000 men and women a year as they work to overcome their pasts, re-imagine their futures, and break the inter-generational cycles of gang violence. Therapeutic and educational offerings (case management, counseling, and classes), practical services (e.g., tattoo removal, work readiness, and legal assistance), and job training-focused business (e.g., Homeboy Bakery, Homegirl Café, and Homeboy Silkscreen & Embroidery) provide healing alternatives to gang life while creating safer and healthier communities.

Board membership
Boyle serves as a member of the National Gang Center Advisory Board. He is also a member of the advisory board for the Loyola Law School Center for Juvenile Law and Policy in Los Angeles.

Published works
In 2010, Boyle's Tattoos on the Heart: The Power of Boundless Compassion, a book recollecting his 20+ years in the barrio, was published by Simon & Schuster. Simon and Schuster published a similar volume in November 2017 titled Barking to the Choir: The Power of Radical Kinship, and in October 2021, published The Whole Language: The Power of Extravagant Tenderness.

Awards
Boyle has received the Civic Medal of Honor from the Los Angeles Area Chamber of Commerce, the California Peace Prize granted by the California Wellness Foundation, the Lifetime Achievement Award from MALDEF, and the James Irvine Foundation’s Leadership Award.

Boyle was named the 2007 Humanitarian of the Year by Bon Appetit magazine.

Boyle was inducted into the California Hall of Fame in December 2011.

In 2014, Boyle was awarded the honorary Doctor of Humane Letters (L.H.D.) from Whittier College.

He was named the 2016 Humanitarian of the Year by the James Beard Foundation, a national culinary-arts organization.

Boyle was selected to receive the Laetare Medal in recognition of outstanding service to the Catholic Church and society in March 2017.

References

External links

 
 PBS Tell Me More: Father Greg Boyle

1954 births
Living people
20th-century American Jesuits
21st-century American Jesuits
American activists
American male non-fiction writers
Gonzaga University alumni
Loyola Marymount University alumni
Boston College School of Theology and Ministry alumni
Catholics from California
Laetare Medal recipients
21st-century American memoirists
James Beard Foundation Award winners